The Ten Curves Road–Manistique River Bridge was a bridge carrying Ten Curves Road over the Manistique River in Germfask Township, Michigan.  It was listed on the National Register of Historic Places in 1999, and was demolished in 2013.

History
The Michigan State Highway Department developed standard plans for long-span concrete through girder bridges with arched girders on cantilevered brackets in 1921-22.  The first bridge of this type constructed in the state was a 90-foot span in Tecumseh, built in 1922.  Another early version of this type of bridge was the 90 foot span, designated Bridge Number 750 02, built in 1923 for the Germfask crossing of the Manistique River.

The Germfask bridge was part of the construction of M-98 between Germfask and nearby Luce County line.  The MSHD awarded Harry Erickson, a contractor from Manistique, the contract to build the bridge this bridge.  Erickson completed the structure in 1923 for a cost of $26,190.81.  The previous trunkline is now downgraded to a county road, but the bridge over the Manistique River remained essentially unaltered until its demolition.

Description

The Ten Curves Road–Manistique River Bridge in Germfask consisted of two 90 foot, arched concrete through girders sitting on concrete brackets cantilevered from concrete abutments.  The roadway was 22.3 feet wide, with an overall structure width of 25.3 feet. Twelve concrete floor beams, integrally cast into the deck, ran between the main spans.  The walls of the bridge were punctured with five small arched cutouts.  Guardrails had been installed at each end of the bridge. Prior to the bridge's demolition, the concrete walls of the bridge were severely spalled, but the bridge remained structurally sound.

See also

References

External links

Ten Curves Road–Manistique River Bridge from BridgeBrowser - includes multiple images.

Road bridges on the National Register of Historic Places in Michigan
Bridges completed in 1923
Buildings and structures in Schoolcraft County, Michigan
Transportation in Schoolcraft County, Michigan
National Register of Historic Places in Schoolcraft County, Michigan
Girder bridges in the United States
Concrete bridges in the United States
1923 establishments in Michigan